NGC 80 is a lenticular galaxy located in the constellation Andromeda. It is interacting with NGC 47 and NGC 68, and is the brightest cluster galaxy of the NGC 80 group, a galaxy group named after it.

References

External links
 
  SEDS

Lenticular galaxies
0080
00203
001351
18280817
Andromeda (constellation)